On August 19, 2017, a net pen at a fish farm near Cypress Island, Washington state, broke, accidentally releasing into the Pacific Ocean hundreds of thousands of non-native Atlantic salmon. The salmon farm was run by Cooke Aquaculture Pacific, LLC. According to the Washington State Department of Natural Resources, the inadequate cleaning of biofouling (roughly ) on the net pens containing the farmed salmon was likely the primary cause for the pen break.

Background
Prior to the incident, Washington was the only state on the Pacific coast where Atlantic salmon was farmed. Atlantic salmon are favored by salmon farmers, since their domestication process is much farther along; farmed Atlantic salmon have been selected for faster growth, higher tolerance to disease, and greater docility.

The net pen was managed by Cooke Aquaculture, a Canadian company based in New Brunswick and one of the largest aquaculture companies in the world. It took over the Cypress Island aquafarms in 2016. The pen that was breached was a 10-cage salmon pen that contained 305,000 fish, placed in 2001. It was anchored in Deepwater Bay, southeast of Cypress Island and to the west of Bellingham Channel which separates Cypress Island from Guemes Island. The August 2017 pen break was preceded by an incident a month earlier in the same pen between July 24–25 where its mooring failed twice. This incident occurred during the highest tidal current level in the summer of 2017.

Initially, the salmon pens were stocked with 369,312 smolts during May 2016 and had been scheduled to be harvested starting September 2017.

Incident
The pen break was reported by a boater on August 19, 2017. The Washington State Department of Natural Resources estimated that 243,000 to 263,000 salmon escaped the pen, which was much higher than Cooke Aquaculture Pacific's estimates of 4,000 to 5,000 salmon. The company later estimated that around 160,000 fish had escaped.

According to Cooke Aquaculture Pacific, the pen break was due to unusually strong tidal currents during that week's solar eclipse, but Washington State Department of Natural Resources investigators found that the tidal currents were well within the range that the net pens had survived in previous years, and the solar eclipse did not affect the tidal currents significantly. The investigators determined that insufficient maintenance and cleaning of the biofouling on the net pens was the primary cause of the break.

Aftermath
In the immediate aftermath of the incident, the Washington State Department of Fish and Wildlife authorized the unlimited catching of escaped Atlantic salmon from the farm, and around 57,000 were recaptured. Coastal tribes such as the Swinomish, Samish, and Lummi were involved in recapturing them. The salmon were sold back to Cooke Aquaculture Pacific, which paid $30 per fish. Cooke offered to raise the price to $42 per fish if the Lummi were willing to abandon their pursuit of a prohibition of salmon aquaculture, but they refused. In November and December 2017, the salmon were captured from the Skagit River by members of the Upper Skagit Indian Tribe. In April 2018, fishermen from the tribe continued to recover salmon from the river, up to eight months after the incident.

The Washington State Senate passed a law in March 2018 banning the farming of Atlantic salmon in the state by 2025. In April 2018, the Thurston County Superior Court upheld the termination of Cooke Aquaculture Pacific's farming license by the Washington State Department of Natural Resources, which effectively prevented the company from restocking its Atlantic salmon fishing pens.

Documentary
Annie Crawley's documentary short film Frankenfish concerning the event was selected for the 2018 Seattle International Film Festival, and shown at the National Oceanographic and Atmospheric Administration–University of Washington Sea Grant Programs River and Ocean Film Festival the same year.

References

Citations

Bibliography

External links
Cypress Island Atlantic Salmon Pen Break, Washington State Department of Natural Resources

2017 in the environment
2017 in Washington (state)
August 2017 events in the United States
Aquaculture in the United States
Environmental disasters in the United States
History of Skagit County, Washington
Salmon